Jadyn Aliana Matthews (born 16 November 1999) is an American-born Jamaican footballer who plays as a defender for Cornell Big Red and the Jamaica women's national team.

International career
Matthews represented Jamaica at the 2018 CONCACAF Women's U-20 Championship. She made her senior debut in a 1–2 loss win against Venezuela on 19 July 2018.

Personal life
Matthews is related to Olympic gold-medalist Don Quarrie.

References

External links

1999 births
Living people
Citizens of Jamaica through descent
Jamaican women's footballers
Women's association football defenders
Women's association football midfielders
Jamaica women's international footballers
Pan American Games competitors for Jamaica
Footballers at the 2019 Pan American Games
People from Palm Beach Gardens, Florida
Sportspeople from Pembroke Pines, Florida
Sportspeople from the Miami metropolitan area
Soccer players from Florida
American women's soccer players
Cornell Big Red women's soccer players
African-American women's soccer players
American sportspeople of Jamaican descent
21st-century African-American sportspeople
21st-century African-American women